Elizabeth Stuart, Countess of Lennox née Cavendish (31 March 1555 – 16 January 1582) was an English noblewoman and the wife of Charles Stuart, 1st Earl of Lennox. She was the mother of Arbella Stuart, a close relation to the English and Scottish thrones.

Family 
Elizabeth Cavendish was born in Chatsworth House, Derbyshire, on 31 March 1555, the daughter of Bess of Hardwick and her second husband Sir William Cavendish. Catherine Grey was one of her godmothers. Bess was a Lady of the Bedchamber to Queen Elizabeth I and became one of the wealthiest women in England. Elizabeth Cavendish had seven siblings, two of whom died in early infancy.

Marriage to the Earl of Lennox 

In 1574, Elizabeth Cavendish secretly married Charles Stuart, 1st Earl of Lennox, the younger brother of Henry Stuart, Lord Darnley, and a claimant to the English throne. Queen Elizabeth I became enraged at the two sets of parents for arranging such a controversial marriage without her permission.  The Queen sent Elizabeth's mother and mother-in-law, Margaret Douglas, to imprisonment in the Tower of London.

In 1575, Elizabeth gave birth to her only child, Arbella Stuart. Her husband died in 1576 of tuberculosis.

Elizabeth herself died six years later on 21 January 1582 at age 26. The Earl of Shrewsbury wrote to William Cecil that his wife, Bess of Hardwick, "takes my daughter Lennox's death so greivously that she neither does nor can think of anything but of lamenting and weeping."

References 

 Antonia Fraser, Mary, Queen of Scots, Dell Publishing Co., Inc. New York, 1971
 David N. Durant, Arbella Stuart: A Rival to the Queen, Weidenfeld & Nicolson, 1978
 Mary S. Lovell, Bess of Hardwick, First Lady of Chatsworth, Little, Brown, 2005

1555 births
1582 deaths
Elizabeth Stuart, Countess of Lennox
16th-century English women
Scottish countesses
16th-century English nobility